Lehit Zeghdane (born 3 October 1977 in Sedan, Ardennes) is a French footballer who plays in Luxembourg National Division for F91 Dudelange. Zeghdane has also played in The Football League for Darlington before moving to Luxembourg.

Career statistics

Club

Honours 
F91 Dudelange
Luxembourg National Division (9): 2001–02, 2004–05, 2005–06, 2006–07, 2007–08, 2008–09, 2010–11, 2011–12, 2013–14
Luxembourg Cup (5): 2004, 2006, 2007, 2009, 2012

References

1977 births
Living people
Association football defenders
French sportspeople of Algerian descent
People from Sedan, Ardennes
French footballers
French expatriate footballers
Darlington F.C. players
F91 Dudelange players
CS Sedan Ardennes players
English Football League players
Expatriate footballers in England
Expatriate footballers in Luxembourg
French expatriate sportspeople in England
French expatriate sportspeople in Luxembourg
Sportspeople from Ardennes (department)
Footballers from Grand Est